Factory Butte in Wayne County, Utah is a  summit in the Upper Blue Hills in northern Wayne County, Utah, United States, about  northwest of Hanksville and about  east of Capitol Reef National Park boundary.

The butte was so named by early settlers who thought its outline resembled a huge factory building, the Provo woolen mill in particular.

Description
The synonymous Factory Butte in Emery County, Utah lies a mere  to the west-northwest. The Walla Walla Union-Bulletin described it as a "Monolith that towers over the San Rafael Desert and harbors pockets of protected cacti". The Bureau of Land Management controls the area and they describe it by saying it is a poplar recreation site for motor vehicles. It is also a place to view wildflowers and tourists also stop at Factory Butte to photograph blooming cacti and desert flowers.

See also

 List of mountains in Utah

References

External links

 

Mountains of Wayne County, Utah
Buttes of Utah